The 2007 European Pairs Speedway Championship was the fourth edition of the European Pairs Speedway Championship. The final was held in Terenzano, Italy on 1 September. The Czech Republic won their second title.

Semifinal 1
  Natschbach-Loipersbach
 May 5

Semifinal 2
  Debrecen
 July 14

Final
  Terenzano
 September 1

See also
 2007 Individual Speedway European Championship

References 

2007
European Pairs